Analândia is a Brazilian municipality of the state of São Paulo. The population is 5,056 (2020 est.) in an area of 326 km². Its original given name in 1887 was Cuscuzeiro, later changing to Anápolis in 1890, and finally taking on the name of Analândia in 1944 to distinguish itself from a homonymous municipality. The originally referenced Cuscuzeiro is a 900 meters tall hill that has now become a local touristic attraction.

It was the location of the Brazilian version of The Simple Life, entitled Simple Life: Mudando de Vida.

References

External links
 Analândia municipality webpage in Brazilian Portuguese

Municipalities in São Paulo (state)